Arnaeus (Ancient Greek: Ἀρναῖος) is a character in Greek mythology.

Mythology
Arnaeus or Irus was the beggar due to his willingness to run messages for the suitors of Penelope (see also Iris, the divine rainbow messenger). He was a beggar in Ithaca who sees Odysseus (disguised as a beggar) encroaching on his territory so he becomes aggressive and begins to insult him. They go back and forth threatening each other until Antinous notices the confrontation and exclaims that watching the two beggars square off would be entertaining. Antinous says that the winner of the fight will be given food and would be permitted to dine with the suitors. The rest of the suitors crowded around the two beggars and they prepared to fight. 

Odysseus removed his rags and tied them around his waist, revealing a surprisingly muscular body because Athena was standing close by making him appear bigger and stronger than he was. When Irus saw this he was intimidated; Antinous told him that should he lose, he would be sent to King Echetus, "the maimer of all men", who would cut off Irus's nose and ears and feed his vitals to the dogs. The suitors pushed Irus towards Odysseus, who entertained the idea of killing Irus, but decided he should just knock him out so the suitors would not suspect anything (it is not disclosed whether Antinous follows through with this threat after Irus's defeat, although the audience, congratulating Odysseus on his victory, say "soon shall we take him to the mainland to King Echetus".). Irus aimed a punch at Odysseus but before he could do anything, Odysseus hit him below the ear, crushing his jawbone. Irus crumpled and Odysseus dragged him outside the hall, leaned him up against the courtyard wall and told him to sit there and scare off the pigs and dogs. He also threatened that if Irus did not stop pushing around the other beggars, things would get worse. Irus's appearance within the epic develops the Homeric themes of punishing the inhospitable and appearances versus reality.

References

Characters in the Odyssey
Fictional beggars